Desarrollo Urbano 3 Ríos is the sixth urban sector and the newest central business district in the central area of Culiacán, Sinaloa, Mexico. The zone is known for city's biggest mall Forum Mall (Mexico).

Key points

Avenues and Streets

 Dr. Enrique Cabrera
 Enrique Félix Castro
 Blvd. Enrique Sánchez Alonso
 Teófilio Noris
 Rotarismo
 Diego Valadez Ríos (New Waterfront)
 Blvd. Alfonso Zaragoza Maytorena
 República de Brasil Street
 Lapislazuli Street
 Alejandro Avilés Inzunza
 Profr. Juan Macedo López
 Luis Donaldo Colosio
 Topacio Street
 Jade Street
 Agata Street
 Ópalo Street
 Esmeralda Street
 Diamante Street
 Perla Street
 Turquesa Street
 Zafiro Street
 Gema Street
 Agua Marina Street
 Diego Rivera Street
 Frida Khalo Street
 José Muro Pico
 David Alfaro Siqueiros
 Teresa Villegas
 Dr. Manuel Romero
 Hermilia Galindo de Topete
 Rosa Melano

Major Shopping Centers
 FORUM Culiacán
 Plaza Royal Culiacán
 Plaza Marizae
 Plaza Tres Ríos
 Plaza Mariana

Buildings
Major buildings in the Tres Ríos zone of Culiacán:

References

Culiacán
Central business districts